Advocate Deepak Salvi (D N Salvi) is a criminal lawyer in the High Court of Bombay. The State of Maharashtra in 2018 appointed him as a Retainer Counsel and Special Legal Advisor on matters relating to Reservation of Scheduled Casts, Scheduled Tribes and Socially and Educationally Backward Classes of people. He is a member of the PCPNDT committee of the State of Maharashtra as their Legal Expert. He was appointed as the Retainer Counsel for the Central Bureau of Investigation in 2009. He was appointed by the CBI as a special prosecutor in the cases of the 1993 Bombay bomb blasts cases, Jalgaon murder case, Sohrabuddin Sheikh fake encounter case. He is known for his contribution in the Adarsh Society Scam Case in helping the Bombay High Court monitor the probe. The High Court of Bombay has appointed him as amicus curiae in several criminal law cases.

He was awarded 'Thane Gaurav Puraskar' (Pride of Thane city award) for his contribution to law and society.

Early life

Born on 20 April 1961. He initially got his bachelor's degree in Science from the University of Mumbai where he further went on to graduate in Law. He registered with the Bar Council of Maharashtra and Goa in 1986 and started his legal practice. He was then appointed as Additional District Judge in the year 2000 from where he resigned in a period of 10 months. Thereafter, he resumed his legal practice.

References

Indian prosecutors
1961 births
University of Mumbai alumni
Living people
Scholars from Mumbai
Special prosecutors